The Columbus State Cougars are the athletic teams that represent Columbus State University, located in Columbus, Georgia, in intercollegiate sports at the Division II level of the National Collegiate Athletic Association (NCAA), primarily competing in the Peach Belt Conference since the 1990–91 academic year.

Columbus State competes in thirteen intercollegiate varsity sports. Men's sports include baseball, basketball, cross country, golf, tennis, and track and field; while women's sports include basketball, cross country, golf, soccer, softball, tennis, and track and field.

Conference affiliations 
NCAA
 Peach Belt Conference (1990–present)

Varsity teams 
The Cougars competed in women's volleyball from 2013–16, compiling a 54–65 record over four seasons.

Sports

Baseball
The Columbus State baseball team  has made eight appearances to the NCAA Division II Baseball Championship, twenty-four NCAA Regional Championship appearances, and is frequently in the NCSWA National Top 30 Poll. The Cougars won the 2002 NCAA Division II World Series and were the national runner-up at the 1986, 2007 and 2018 NCAA Division II World Series.

NCAA Division II Baseball Championship

NCAA Regional Championship

Golf
The CSU golf team has won six NCAA National Championships; 1978, 1980, 1989, 1992, 1994 and 1997.

Rifle

In April 2015, the school's co-ed rifle program was discontinued after existing for six seasons. Prior to discontinuation the team competed at the Division I level as members of the Ohio Valley Conference starting in the 2012–13 school year.

Former assistant rifle coach, Jamie Gray, won the gold medal at the 2012 London Olympics in the Women's 50 meter rifle three positions event with a score of 691.9.

Columbus State Athletics Department co-hosted the 2011 Rifle National Championship with Fort Benning. This was the first time a national championship was hosted on CSU's campus.

Women's Soccer
The Lady Cougar soccer team has made 13 consecutive NCAA Tournaments since 2006, just its third season in existence. Columbus State has won or shared 12 of the last 14 Peach Belt Conference regular season championships, making 12 PBC Tournament championship games in that span and winning eight (2006–08, 2010, 2014–16, 2018). Head coach Jay Entlich, a seven-time PBC Coach of the Year (2005, 2008, 2014–18), has guided the Lady Cougars since their 2004 inception.

NCAA Division II Southeast Region Championships (6)

National championships

Team

Individual

Notable alumni

Baseball 
 Jason Rogers

Men's basketball 
 Kenney Funderburk
 Ty Harris
 Matthías Orri Sigurðarson

Softball 
 Nathalie Fradette

References

External links